Webb Mountain Park is a 135-acre municipal park that offers hiking trails, rock climbing, nature study, and campsites in Monroe, Connecticut. The park backs up onto land where a historic castle building and residences for nuns are located. Webb Mountain Discovery Zone nature center with its own 170 acre park is adjacent. The park has diverse flora including numerous kinds of trees, shrubs, and ferns that not only add to the aesthetic value of the place but provide an ideal setting for some amateur as well as scientific study of the local plants. The park is adjacent to the town-owned Webb Mountain Discovery Zone.

History

Webb Mountain Park was a farm owned by the Mr. and Mrs. Alfred E. Wagner which was purchased by the Town of Monroe in 1972.

A 1979 study evaluated lands around the park and in 2004 170 acres of property adjacent were purchased by the town. In 2005 a study titled Webb Mountain Park Extension was carried out on the surrounding lands The adjacent property became Discovery Zone park. Several acres were also added to Webb Mountain Park as part of the deal. The 100-acre Aquarion watershed property is also adjacent to the parks. The park borders the Housatonic River and is adjacent to the Stevenson Dam and Lake Zoar, the fifth-largest lake in Connecticut. Trails in the park join with the Connecticut Forrest and Park Associations Paugussett Trail.

Flora
The trees found here include (to name a few) Eastern hemlock (Tsuga canadensis), Eastern black oak (Quercus velutina), Red Maple (Acer rubrum), Sugar Maple (Acer saccharum), Shagbark hickory (Carya ovata), Tree of Heaven (Ailanthus altissima), Flowering dogwood (Cornus florida) and Tulip tree (Liriodendron tulipifera). There are also herbs such as the Hepatica americana and Indian pipe (Monotropa uniflora).

Rock climbing
The park is a site of rock climbing, on its Collinsville Formation rock, predominantly schist with layers of amphibolite and gneiss. The park connects up with a 13.5 mile trail network. It also has several marked side trails. It is dog friendly.

Hiking and camping
The park is traversed by the Paugussett Trail and contains a number of side trails. Camping is allowed in the park.

References

External links
 Webb Mountain Park - official site
 Webb Mountain Park map

 

Monroe, Connecticut
Parks in Fairfield County, Connecticut
Blue-Blazed Trails
Protected areas of Fairfield County, Connecticut